Eis- und Schwimmstadion, is an arena in Cologne, Germany.  It is primarily used for ice hockey, and was the home to the Kölner Haie of the Deutsche Eishockey Liga until the Lanxess Arena opened in 1998.  It opened in 1936 and holds 7,200 spectators.

References

Indoor arenas in Germany
Indoor ice hockey venues in Germany
Buildings and structures in Cologne
Sport in Cologne
Sports venues in North Rhine-Westphalia